Fakhruddin Ahmed (born 1 May 1940) is a Bangladeshi economist, civil servant, and a former governor of the Bangladesh Bank, the country's central bank.

On 12 January 2007, he was appointed Chief Adviser (Head of the Government) of the non-party interim Caretaker government, during the 2006–2008 Bangladeshi political crisis. He continued in that post for nearly two years, a longer than usual time, but new elections were held on 29 December 2008, and the Awami League assumed power based on its majority.

Early life and career 
Ahmed was born on 1 May 1940 in Munshiganj to Mohiuddin Ahmed. He studied economics at Dhaka University, where he obtained his BA (Hons) and MA in 1960 and 1961, respectively, standing first in his class both times. He earned a master's degree in development economics from Williams College and a Ph.D. in economics from Princeton University in 1975. His doctoral dissertation was titled "Migration and employment in a multisector model; an application to Bangladesh."

He then became managing director of the Palli Karma-Sahayak Foundation (PKSF), the country's apex micro-finance organisation, beginning on 1 June 2005.

2007 interim caretaker government

On 12 January 2007, President Iajuddin Ahmed swore him in as Chief Adviser to the Interim Caretaker Government, after the former interim government under the President was dissolved. Fakhruddin Ahmed is credited with bringing an end to the anarchy that had threatened to sweep the nation.

More than 160 senior politicians, top civil servants, and security officials were arrested on charges of graft and other economic crimes. Included were former ministers from the two main political parties, the Awami League and the Bangladesh National Party, including former prime ministers Sheikh Hasina and Khaleda Zia, and the former acting prime minister Fazlul Haque.

Ahmed fainted while giving a speech at a tree-planting event on 3 June 2007, apparently due to the heat, and was hospitalized. He was released from the hospital later the same day and has said that he was well.

References

External links
 Fakhruddin Ahmed on Banglapedia.
 Q&A: Bangladesh's Leader Fakhruddin Ahmed, Time.

1940 births
20th-century Bangladeshi economists
21st-century Bangladeshi economists
Living people
University of Dhaka alumni
Princeton University alumni
Williams College alumni
People from Bikrampur
Prime Ministers of Bangladesh
Bangladeshi bankers
Governors of Bangladesh Bank
Bangladeshi expatriates in the United States